Pritchardia remota,  the Nihoa pritchardia, Nihoa fan palm, or Loulu, is a species of palm endemic on the island of Nihoa, Hawaii, and later transplanted to the island of Laysan. It is the only type of tree on the island and used to be abundant. In 1885 a wildfire ravaged the island, destroying most of the palms. Only about 700 of these trees remain, making the species endangered but numbers are slowly increasing. The palm is being cultivated in botanical gardens.

Though it is impossible to mistake P. remota for any other species in its natural habitat, it can be discerned from other Pritchardia species by its wavy leaves, its short and hairless inflorescences, and its tiny, spherical fruits.

A similar undescribed species existed on Laysan, the Laysan fan palm, but was made extinct after Laysan was mined for guano.

Habitat
A 1996 survey found a total of four plant populations of 680 palms on the island.  Groves of P. remota palms grow in coastal mesic valley depressions in two valleys on Nihoa: The largest population grows in the West Palm Valley, while the three smaller populations are found in the East Palm Valley. Up to 50% of the pollen found in soil cores taken from lowland sites in the Main Islands comes from Pritchardia palms similar to this species. This is because these palms were once abundant there until around the year 1000, when the human population grew dramatically. The trees were cleared for agriculture and used for timber and firewood.

Ancient Nihoans probably used the trees expansively as well , and this could have caused their water supply to be contaminated with guano. This, in conjunction with several drought years due to El Niño, could have caused the residents of Nihoa to give up and return to the Main Islands, which indeed happened before Nihoa was discovered by the Europeans in the 18th century. The species's longevity is also threatened by flash floods which have been noted to occur in the lower part of Nihoa's East Palm Valley, one habitat of the palm.

Pritchardia remota provides a nesting place for red-footed boobies and a perching spot for brown noddies.

References

Bibliography

remota
Endemic flora of Nihoa
Trees of Hawaii
Taxa named by Odoardo Beccari